Leekfrith is a civil parish in the district of Staffordshire Moorlands, Staffordshire, England. It contains 23 listed buildings that are recorded in the National Heritage List for England.  Of these, two are at Grade II*, the middle of the three grades, and the others are at Grade II, the lowest grade.  The parish contains the village of Meerbrook and the hamlet of Upper Hulme, and is otherwise rural.  Most of the listed buildings are houses and associated structures, cottages, farmhouses and farm buildings.  The other listed buildings include a church and a memorial in the churchyard, a chapel, a former school, and a telephone kiosk.


Key

Buildings

References

Citations

Sources

Lists of listed buildings in Staffordshire